Termas de Monfortinho is a spa town in the municipality of Idanha-a-Nova, Portugal. It is one of the main crossings on the Portugal–Spain border.

Termas has 307 inhabitants (2011) and is about 3 km from the parish headquarters, Monfortinho.

References

Spa towns in Portugal
Idanha-a-Nova
Portugal–Spain border crossings